Wing-Northup House, also known as the Washington County Historical Society Headquarters, is a historic home located at Fort Edward in Washington County, New York.  It was built about 1815 by entrepreneur Daniel Wood Wing and is a two-story, five-bay, center entrance brick front building, with a two-story brick ell.  A one-story brick side wing was added about 1880.  The property was acquired in 1884 by James M. Northup, and in 1982 by the Washington County Historical Society.

It was listed on the National Register of Historic Places in 2008.

References

External links
Washington County Historical Society website

Houses on the National Register of Historic Places in New York (state)
Federal architecture in New York (state)
Houses completed in 1815
Houses in Washington County, New York
National Register of Historic Places in Washington County, New York